Table tennis at the 1996 Summer Paralympics consisted of 28 events, 17 for men and 11 for women.

Medal table

Participating nations

Medal summary

Men's events

Women's events

See also 
Table tennis at the 1996 Summer Olympics

References 

 

1996 Summer Paralympics events
1996
1996 in table tennis
Table tennis competitions in the United States